José Ramón Bauzá Díaz (born 16 November 1970) is a Spanish politician and the president of the Autonomous Community of the Balearic Islands from 2011 to 2015. Born to a Majorcan father and a mother native to Madrid, he is licensed as a pharmacist by the Complutense University of Madrid. He owns his own pharmacy in his hometown of Marratxí.

Political career 
In the People´s Party

 1995-1999: Councillor in the opposition of Marrachí City Council.
 2001-2003: deputy mayor for Town Planning and Health in the City Council of Marrachí.
 2005-2011: Mayor of Marrachí.
 2007-2009: vice-president of the Partido Popular of Baleares.
 2009-2015: president of the Partido Popular of the Balearic Islands.
 2011-2015: president of the Balearic Islands.
 2015-2019: senator appointed by the Balearic Islands Parliament.

In Citizens

 2019-2024: Member of the European Parliament

References

Living people
1970 births
Presidents of the Balearic Islands
Members of the Parliament of the Balearic Islands
Politicians from Madrid
People's Party (Spain) politicians
MEPs for Spain 2019–2024